William Henry Peter Barber (10 September 1857 – 15 January 1943) was a New Zealand Member of Parliament for Newtown in Wellington.

Early life and family
Born in Wellington in 1857, Barber was educated at St Peter's School.  He began work in his father's dyeing firm of Barber and Company, and eventually became its head. He married Emily Clarke, of Somerset, England, in 1879, and had three sons and two daughters.

Member of Parliament

William Barber represented the Wellington electorate of Newtown for the whole of its existence, from 1902 to 1908. In 1908 he was defeated for the reconstituted electorate of Wellington South.

New Liberal Party
Barber was associated with the New Liberal Party. His favourite idea was one shared by the other New Liberals-that the institutions of local government should be strengthened and given more scope and power. He heartily supported Harry Ell's 1904 Municipal Corporations Bill, which provided for borough councils to hold referendums.

Barber also advocated state fire insurance, state coal mines, and the old radical favourite, reduction of taxes on the necessities of life. However, he did not favour the elective executive.

Other activities
He served as a director of the Wellington Woollen Company (chairman at the time of his death), and chairman of directors of the Wellington Opera House Company. He was elected to the Wellington City Council in 1891 and served as a councilor for 26 years. He contested the 1905 Wellington City mayoral election and came second, beaten by Thomas William Hislop. He was a member of the Hutt Valley Electric Power Board (retired 1933); director of Wellington Deposit and Mortgage Company; chairman of the Wellington College Board of Governors (1924–31) and a member of the Kauri Timber Royal Commission.

In 1935, he was awarded the King George V Silver Jubilee Medal.

Death
Barber died in Wellington on 15 January 1943, and was buried at Karori Cemetery.

References

Further reading

External links
Photo of Barber driving a car, purchased from William McLean

1857 births
1943 deaths
New Zealand Liberal Party MPs
Wellington City Councillors
New Zealand businesspeople
People from Wellington City
New Liberal Party (New Zealand) MPs
Members of the New Zealand House of Representatives
New Zealand MPs for Wellington electorates
Unsuccessful candidates in the 1908 New Zealand general election
Burials at Karori Cemetery